The Luftwaffe Institute of Aviation Medicine, in German called Flugmedizinisches Institut der Luftwaffe (FLMEDINSTLW) is the central institute of aviation medicine of the German airforce (Luftwaffe). It was founded in 1959 and is located in Fürstenfeldbruck.

Tasks
 scientific basic and advanced training for flight surgeons as well as further education
 medical examinations, observations and treatment of aircrew, ability tests
 appropriation of aeromedical expertise
 serves as an aeromedical center (AMC)

References

External links
 Flugmedizinisches Institut der Luftwaffe (German)

Aviation medicine organizations
Institute of Aviation Medicine
Buildings and structures in Fürstenfeldbruck (district)
Medical and health organisations based in Bavaria
Military medical training establishments
Aviation organisations based in Germany